Dermomurex oxum is a species of sea snail, a marine gastropod mollusk in the family Muricidae, the murex snails or rock snails.

Description
The length of the shell varies between 8 mm and 16 mm.

Distribution
This species occurs in the Caribbean Sea off Panama, French Guiana and in the Atlantic Ocean off northeast Brazil.

References

 Merle D., Garrigues B. & Pointier J.-P. (2011) Fossil and Recent Muricidae of the world. Part Muricinae. Hackenheim: Conchbooks. 648 pp. page(s): 223
Muricidae récoltés en Guyane au cours de l’expédition La Planète Revisitée. Xenophora Taxonomy 15: 29-38

Gastropods described in 1979
Dermomurex